is a private girls junior and senior high school in Hakone, Kanagawa Prefecture, Japan. It has an affiliated primary school

The school is on the grounds of Fuji-Hakone National Park.  the school has a total of 350 students, with 170 at the junior high level and 180 at the senior high level.

References

External links
 Kanrei Shirayuri Gakuen Junior/Senior High School 

Schools in Kanagawa Prefecture
Girls' schools in Japan
High schools in Kanagawa Prefecture
Private schools in Japan